Leaf warblers are small insectivorous passerine birds belonging to the genus Phylloscopus. 

Leaf warblers were formerly included in the Old World warbler family but are now considered to belong to the family Phylloscopidae, introduced in 2006. The family originally included the genus Seicercus, but all species have been moved to Phylloscopus in the most recent classification. Leaf warblers are active, constantly moving, often flicking their wings as they glean the foliage for insects along the branches of trees and bushes. They forage at various levels within forests, from the top canopy to the understorey. Most of the species are markedly territorial both in their summer and winter quarters. Most are greenish or brownish above and off-white or yellowish below. Compared to some other "warblers", their songs are very simple. Species breeding in temperate regions are usually strongly migratory.

Description
The species are of various sizes, often green-plumaged above and yellow below, or more subdued with greyish-green to greyish-brown colours, varying little or not at all with the seasons. The tails are not very long and contain 12 feathers (unlike the similar Abroscopus species, which have 10 tail feathers). Many species are more easily identified by their distinctive songs than their dull plumage. Several of the larger species are similar in size including the large-billed leaf warbler, Radde's warbler and the pale-legged leaf warbler.

Distribution and habitat
Its members occur in Eurasia, ranging into Wallacea and Africa with one species, the Arctic warbler, breeding as far east as Alaska. Many of the species breed at temperate and high latitudes in Eurasia and migrate substantial distances to winter in southeastern Asia, India, or Africa. One example is Tickell's leaf warbler, which breeds in scrub at high elevation in the Himalayas and on the Tibetan Plateau and then moves down-slope and south to winter in the Himalayan foothills of India and Burma. Most live in forest and scrub and many are canopy or sub-canopy dwellers.

Behavior and ecology
The family Phylloscopidae comprises many small tree-loving warbler species that feed by gleaning insects from leaves or catching food on the wing.

Taxonomy
The genus Phylloscopus was introduced by the German zoologist Friedrich Boie in 1826 to accommodate a single species, the willow warbler, which is therefore considered as the type species. The name combines the Ancient Greek phullon meaning "leaf" and skopos meaning "seeker" (from skopeo, "to watch"). Phylloscopus is the only genus placed in the family Phylloscopidae that was introduced in 2006 by the Swedish ornithologist Per Alström and coworkers.

The genus contains 81 species: Of these, eleven species were formerly placed in the genus Seicercus, but a 2018 molecular phylogeny study indicated that the genus Seicercus is a synonym of Phylloscopus, leaving the family Phylloscopidae with a single genus, Phylloscopus.

 Wood warbler, Phylloscopus sibilatrix
 Western Bonelli's warbler, Phylloscopus bonelli
 Eastern Bonelli's warbler, Phylloscopus orientalis
 Buff-barred warbler, Phylloscopus pulcher
 Ashy-throated warbler, Phylloscopus maculipennis
 Hume's leaf warbler, Phylloscopus humei
 Yellow-browed warbler, Phylloscopus inornatus
 Brooks's leaf warbler, Phylloscopus subviridis
 Chinese leaf warbler, Phylloscopus yunnanensis
 Lemon-rumped warbler, Phylloscopus chloronotus
 Sichuan leaf warbler, Phylloscopus forresti
 Gansu leaf warbler, Phylloscopus kansuensis
 Pallas's leaf warbler, Phylloscopus proregulus
 Tytler's leaf warbler, Phylloscopus tytleri
 Yellow-streaked warbler, Phylloscopus armandii
 Radde's warbler, Phylloscopus schwarzi
 Sulphur-bellied warbler, Phylloscopus griseolus
 Tickell's leaf warbler, Phylloscopus affinis (includes the Alpine leaf warbler, P. a. occisinensis)
 Smoky warbler, Phylloscopus fuligiventer
 Dusky warbler, Phylloscopus fuscatus
 Plain leaf warbler, Phylloscopus neglectus
 Buff-throated warbler, Phylloscopus subaffinis
 Willow warbler, Phylloscopus trochilus
 Mountain chiffchaff, Phylloscopus sindianus
 Canary Islands chiffchaff, Phylloscopus canariensis
 Eastern Canary Islands chiffchaff, Phylloscopus canariensis exsul (extinct: 1986?)
 Western Canary Islands chiffchaff, Phylloscopus canariensis canariensis
 Common chiffchaff, Phylloscopus collybita
 Iberian chiffchaff, Phylloscopus brehmii
 Eastern crowned warbler, Phylloscopus coronatus
 Ijima's leaf warbler, Phylloscopus ijimae
 Philippine leaf warbler, Phylloscopus olivaceus
 Lemon-throated leaf warbler, Phylloscopus cebuensis
 Yellow-throated woodland warbler, Phylloscopus ruficapilla
 Brown woodland warbler, Phylloscopus umbrovirens
 Red-faced woodland warbler, Phylloscopus laetus
 Laura's woodland warbler, Phylloscopus laurae
 Black-capped woodland warbler, Phylloscopus herberti
 Uganda woodland warbler, Phylloscopus budongoensis
 White-spectacled warbler, Phylloscopus intermedius – (previously Seicercus affinis)
 Grey-cheeked warbler, Phylloscopus poliogenys – (previously placed in Seicercus)
 Green-crowned warbler, Phylloscopus burkii – (previously placed in Seicercus)
 Grey-crowned warbler, Phylloscopus tephrocephalus – (previously placed in Seicercus)
 Whistler's warbler, Phylloscopus whistleri – (previously placed in Seicercus)
 Bianchi's warbler, Phylloscopus valentini – (previously placed in Seicercus)
 Alström's warbler, Phylloscopus soror – (first described in 1999; previously placed in Seicercus)
 Martens's warbler, Phylloscopus omeiensis – (first described in 1999; previously placed in Seicercus)
 Green warbler, Phylloscopus nitidus
 Two-barred warbler, Phylloscopus plumbeitarsus
 Greenish warbler, Phylloscopus trochiloides
 Emei leaf warbler, Phylloscopus emeiensis
 Large-billed leaf warbler, Phylloscopus magnirostris
 Sakhalin leaf warbler, Phylloscopus borealoides
 Pale-legged leaf warbler, Phylloscopus tenellipes
 Japanese leaf warbler, Phylloscopus xanthodryas
 Kamchatka leaf warbler, Phylloscopus examinandus
 Arctic warbler, Phylloscopus borealis
 Chestnut-crowned warbler, Phylloscopus castaniceps – (previously placed in Seicercus)
 Sunda warbler, Phylloscopus grammiceps – (previously placed in Seicercus)
 Yellow-breasted warbler, Phylloscopus montis – (previously placed in Seicercus)
 Limestone leaf warbler, Phylloscopus calciatilis – (first described in 2010)
 Sulphur-breasted warbler, Phylloscopus ricketti
 Yellow-vented warbler, Phylloscopus cantator
 Western crowned warbler, Phylloscopus occipitalis
 Blyth's leaf warbler, Phylloscopus reguloides
 Claudia's leaf warbler, Phylloscopus claudiae
 Hartert's leaf warbler, Phylloscopus goodsoni
 Kloss's leaf warbler, Phylloscopus ogilviegranti – (formerly considered as a subspecies of Davison's leaf warbler)
 Hainan leaf warbler, Phylloscopus hainanus
 Davison's leaf warbler, Phylloscopus intensior – (previously white-tailed leaf warbler, Phylloscopus davisoni)
 Grey-hooded warbler, Phylloscopus xanthoschistos
 Mountain leaf warbler, Phylloscopus trivirgatus
 Negros leaf warbler, Phylloscopus nigrorum
 Timor leaf warbler, Phylloscopus presbytes
 Flores leaf warbler, Phylloscopus floresianus – (formerly considered as a subspecies of the Timor leaf warbler)
Rote leaf warbler, Phylloscopus rotiensis (first described in 2018)
 Makira leaf warbler, Phylloscopus makirensis
Sulawesi leaf warbler, Phylloscopus nesophilus – (formerly considered as a subspecies of Lompobattang leaf warbler)
 Lompobattang leaf warbler, Phylloscopus sarasinorum
 Kolombangara leaf warbler, Phylloscopus amoenus
 Island leaf warbler, Phylloscopus poliocephalus
 Numfor leaf warbler, Phylloscopus maforensis
 Biak leaf warbler, Phylloscopus misoriensis
Two birds were described in 2020 but have not yet been recognised as species by the International Ornithologists' Union.
Peleng leaf warbler, Phylloscopus suaramerdu
Taliabu leaf warbler, Phylloscopus emilsalimi
The alpine leaf warbler, Phylloscopus occisinensis, was reclassified as conspecific with Tickell's leaf warbler (P. affinis) by the IOC, but other authorities such as eBird still consider it distinct.

References

Further reading
Badyaev, Alexander V. & Leaf, Elizabeth S. (1997): "Habitat associations of song characteristics in Phylloscopus and Hippolais warblers". Auk 114(1): 40–46.

External links

Leaf warbler videos on the Internet Bird Collection

Taxa named by Friedrich Boie